Metopocoilus maculicollis is a species of beetle in the family Cerambycidae. It was described by Audinet-Serville in 1832.

References

Trachyderini
Beetles described in 1832